Al-Ittihad Sports Club also known as Ittihad Wad Madani is a Sudanese football club based in Wad Madani. They played in the top division in Sudanese football, Sudan Premier League. Their home stadium is Stade Wad Medani. Their rival is Ahli Madani, a team which is in the same city as Itthad Madani. The derby in Madani is called Madani Derby, which is one of the biggest derby in Sudan.

Honours

National titles
Sudan Premier League
Runner-up (1): 1966 
Sudan Cup
Winners (1): 1990

Performance in CAF competitions
African Cup Winners' Cup: 1 appearance
1991 – Second Round

Performance in UAFA competitions
Arab Cup Winners' Cup
1991 –Group stage

References

Football clubs in Sudan
1933 establishments in Sudan